Amar Lal is the Prime Minister of Pakistan's advisor to minority affairs in the country. He was recently appointed by Muhammad Mian Soomro as special advisor to the control of madrassas in Pakistan, even though he is a Hindu.

References

Pakistani Hindus
Living people
Year of birth missing (living people)
Hindu political parties